Waterhead Academy is a secondary school with academy status located in Oldham, Greater Manchester, England. The academy was taken out of special measures in June 2016 and was one of the most improved academies in the country in 2016. The Academy is rated as good by Ofsted (leadership) and is sponsored by South Pennines Academies Trust.

The academy first opened in September 2010, following the formal closure of Counthill School in Moorside and Breeze Hill School in Oldham. The academy was initially located at the two campuses of the former schools, however it relocated to a new main campus in November 2012. The main campus is located on the site of the former Orb Mill. The academy also operates a sports campus which is located at the site of the former Counthill School.

History
Waterhead Academy began with the merging of two Oldham secondary schools: the predominantly Asian Breeze Hill School in Oldham and the predominantly White British Counthill School in Moorside, using a strategy of 'forced integration' in an attempt to quell racial tension between Oldham children.

References

External links
Waterhead Academy official website
The integrated school that could teach a divided town to live together Dave Edmonds, Guardian article on forced integration study, 5 November 2015.

Secondary schools in the Metropolitan Borough of Oldham
Educational institutions established in 2010
Academies in the Metropolitan Borough of Oldham
2010 establishments in England
Schools in Oldham